Remastering Project is a music video remastering project by South Korean record label SM Entertainment and YouTube. The project intends to remaster music videos from the 1990s to the 2010s. It also plans to showcase the history of K-pop to international music fans to contribute to the growth of the Korean music industry. Remastered music videos were sequentially released starting from November 4, 2021.

History 

Through SM Congress 2021, SM Entertainment's chief executive officer (CEO), Lee Sung-soo, introduces the company's plan in advancing into the K-pop 2.0 era with prosumers who created original content and Re-Created content. The said plan will carry out various projects such as the company's remastering project for music and music videos, Pink Blood project to promote and support prosumers, and SM Classics. H.O.T. member, Kangta, introduced SM's Remastering Project, where music videos that have been released in the past will be remastered with new quality, planning, and visuals. Kangta stated that one could feel the "freshness" of that era looking at a quality of 4K resolution. He further revealed that SM then joined hands with YouTube to showcase the history of K-pop and introduce it through the online video platform to contribute to the growth of the Korean music industry.

Through an online press conference held on November 4, 2021, SM Entertainment and YouTube announced the remastering project for K-pop music videos. The Remastering Project is a project to remaster music videos from the 1990s and 2000s and showcase them to global music fans through the online video platform. It is planned to introduce the history of K-pop to international music fans by conducting various campaigns using YouTube. YouTube will release music videos of various K-pop artists through cooperation with the distributors and agencies such as Ogam Entertainment, Genie Music, Collab Asia, the Recording Industry Association of Korea, and NHN Bugs, with more suitable quality for digital platforms. Moreover, the two companies will also collaborate with various YouTube creators to promote the project.

Videography 

For the project, SM Entertainment plans to showcase more than 300 remastered music videos and songs on YouTube's original channel as it is considered a "valuable asset" of the company and part of the K-pop history that "cannot be found anywhere else". Music videos of about 50 artists will be released sequentially every week starting from November 4, 2021 under the themes of 1990s dance and 2000s dance & hip-hop.

Remaster

Remake

References

External links 

 Official website

SM Entertainment
YouTube